Predrag Stamenković (Serbian Cyrillic: Предраг Стаменковић; born 7 July 1977) is a Serbian football defender.

References

1977 births
Living people
Sportspeople from Niš
Serbian footballers
FK Radnički Niš players
FK Mladost Apatin players
FK Smederevo players
Serbian SuperLiga players
Association football defenders